The Black Hills Flood of 1972, also known as the Rapid City Flood, was the most detrimental flood in South Dakota history, and one of the deadliest floods in U.S. history. The flood took place on June 9–10, 1972 in the Black Hills of Western South Dakota.  of rain in a small area over the Black Hills caused Rapid Creek and other waterways to overflow. Severe flooding of residential and commercial properties in Rapid City occurred when Canyon Lake Dam became clogged with debris and failed in the late evening hours of June 9 resulting in 238 deaths and 3,057 injuries. Over 1,335 homes and 5,000 automobiles were destroyed. The value of property damage was estimated to be over US$160 million in 1972 dollars ($ in  dollars). Flooding also occurred in Battle, Spring, Bear Butte, and Boxelder creeks.

Causes
A few days before the Rapid City Flood, "earlier rains had left the soil saturated, increasing the amount of runoff of the flood to come." On the afternoon of June 9, substantial rains fell on the area, caused by "an almost stationary group of thunderstorms."

Additionally, "a strong low-level easterly flow which forced the moist unstable air up-slope on the hills. This sustained orographic effect helped the air to rise, cool, and release its moisture in repeating thunderstorms. Another contributing factor was the unusually light winds at a higher atmospheric levels which did not disperse the moist air nor move the thunderstorms along to prevent an extreme concentration of rainfall."

According to Herbert Thompson the air pattern causing this storm was noticed in big measure over the Great Plains, with a minor scale to the east of the Rockies. There were only what appeared to be light winds, so nothing indicated that there was a huge storm underway. Thompson further indicates that a cold high pressure region was pushed from Canada into the Great Lakes region leading into the western part of South Dakota. A "mesoscale cloud mass" from Colorado also moved towards Rapid City. One of the cloud masses amplified the "mid-level moisture over Rapid City," while the other mass caused the pressure to stay, as the high pressure pushed downward, thus creating the right conditions to produce rainfall. The rainfall from the upper "cloud mass" above the Black Hills formed into new smaller masses downwind which reprocessed the rain allowing for the constant rainfall. The storm was described by Nair, Hjelmfelt, and Pielke as "convective cells of high precipitation efficiency a characteristic of tropical precipitation systems. Cloud seeding experiments being conducted by the Institute of Atmospheric Sciences on clouds west of Rapid City were speculated to have contributed to the unusual amount of rain. However, there is no evidence that the two phenomena were related.

The immense precipitation was based over the "Rapid, Boxelder, Spring, and Battle Creeks," creating run-off, along these creeks which led to flooding throughout the surrounding areas.

The intense rain began on the afternoon of June 9 and continued until after midnight on June 10. The immense amount of rain the Black Hills received during the thunderstorms ranged from 4 to 15 inches, causing Rapid Creek and surrounding creeks to overflow and creating massive amounts of runoff that resulted in flood waters. The run-off carried rubble to the Canyon Lake Dam creating a barrier in front of its spillway. This resulted in the "increase in depth of water behind the dam of 11 to 12 feet," which caused the release of more water adding to the already moving floodwaters. The flash flood hit Rapid City the hardest around midnight on June 9; the flood waters also hit the small town of Keystone nearby.

Damage

The flood caused a tremendous amount of damage. Flood waters displaced large rocks, trees, trailers, and vehicles, and carried homes away. In Rapid City the flood resulted in the deaths of "238 including 5 missing," 14 of the deaths were trained professionals. The flood resulted in over 3,000 people being injured. A total of 1,335 homes were ruined, and 2,820 homes were damaged. More than 200 businesses were ruined, and around 5,000 cars were demolished. The damage in Rapid City totaled $66 million in 1972 dollar value. As for Keystone, "eight people were killed and much of the town was washed away." The damage in Keystone totaled around $1.5 million. The total cost of the 1972 Black Hills flood totaled $165 million, including infrastructure and utilities. The total amount of rain the Black Hills received was "800,000 acre feet" equal to "1 billion metric tons of water."

The National Weather Service Office (NWS) in Rapid City in 1972 was taking hourly surface observations, issuing local storm warnings and providing local forecasts to the media. The personnel in Rapid City were not properly trained to make forecasts or use the technologies available to them. They lacked access to vital weather information to warn the area citizens.

Then and now

The Rapid City National Weather Service is now a forecast office with a full-time staff of meteorologists who issue both forecasts and warnings for northeastern Wyoming and the western third of South Dakota.  In 1972, the National Weather Service office in Rapid City did not have a teletype system to broadcast warnings.  They instead used a one-way telephone hotline to the media to broadcast the warnings.  Today warnings are sent to a regional site where they are sent to the National Oceanic and Atmospheric Administration (NOAA) Weather Wire System satellite.  NWS forecasters use the state radio system to notify 9-1-1 dispatchers and emergency personnel.  This warning is also passed on to the Emergency Alert System (EAS).

In the aftermath of the 1972 flood, short-term and long-term programs were put into effect.  Many businesses were permitted to stay in the flood plain, but houses and motels were either raised or moved due to the likelihood that a flood would occur while a person may be sleeping.  The majority of the flood plain was made into large parks, which have increased in number and have been improved and updated on a continuing basis. Canyon Lake Dam and most bridges were redesigned to prevent debris clogs during flooding.

Victims

Victims lost precious memories as stated in the Rapid City newspaper.  An excerpt from the newspaper reads, "Operation Family Treasure' may provide hope for people.'  For those who have given up all hope about finding a priceless photo album or sheet of important personal papers there may be a happy ending with "Operation Family Treasure," a clearing house for irreplaceable items run by the Rapid City Jaycees in conjunction with the Office of Civil defense.  Flood disaster victims advised on tax breaks."

2012 saw the 40 year anniversary of the fateful flood.  Survivors remarked on the horrific events. Rita, who was 20 at the time, described the scene, "There was so many [people] in trees and screaming and crying and the sparks were flying from electric wires, houses were on fire, it was just — it was hell," she says.  Rita was seven months pregnant at the time of the tragedy.  She describes her fears as, "I wouldn't wish that upon nobody," she says. "That's a nightmare and a half to think that you're going to die in water and your mom is gonna go with you and you're trying to do your best to keep your mom alive."  Rita and her mother were swept against a building and thankfully rescued.  There were others with the same experience while others were worse.  Good Samaritans like Alex were left to clean up the mess and search for the less fortunate.  He describes a gruesome scene, "I found a boy about 5 years old," Alex says. "He was dead, laying on some debris. I didn't touch him or nothing, I just went back and told the authorities where he was at. Then I quit."

Reactions
One unidentified resident of Rapid City, which was flooded, spoke to a reporter after the flood.
"...the only thing above water is the hilltops. I guess it just ... I guess we gotta couple troubles."

Another survivor said:
"My house is no more. You can see it over there, there's the, well, there just isn't anything."

And another unidentified survivor added:
"A man knocked at our door and said, 'Get out as fast as you can.' We grabbed the children and my dad's crippled and we picked him up and put him in the car, and just as we drove out the driveway, a big trailer started floating right across the pathway, and we just made it up the hill and that was all it was. Everything was gone."

One source, Sean Potter, Certified Consulting Meteorologist and Certified Broadcast Meteorologist, wrote, "I called my best advisor, Mr. Leonard Swanson, the City Public Works Director, and we met at City Hall. Heavy rains were falling, and Mr. Swanson and I drove to Canyon Lake Park where a city worker and his family lived in the park caretaker's home, immediately below the dam. Swanny ordered the caretaker, a Parks Department employee, to immediately take his family, leave their evening meal on the table and get out of the park. The entire family survived the flood. Not a trace of the home (it was city property) or the contents was ever found.

Notes

References
Carter, Janet M., Joyce E. Williamson, and Ralph W. Teller. “The 1972 Black Hills-Rapid City Flood Revisited.” USGS Science for a Changing World. U.S. Geological Survey, April 2002. Web October 11, 2012.
Dennis, Arnett. "A Memoir of the Rapid City Flood of 1972" 2010. Print.
Nair, U.S., Hjelmfelt R. Mark, and Pielke A. Robert, Sr. “Numerical Simulation of the 9–10 June 1972 Black Hills Storm Using CSU RAMS.”  Monthly Weather Review 125. (1997): 1753–1766. Print
Taylor, Danielle. "Agency Spotlight: Rapid City Parks and Recreation, South Dakota."Parks and Recreation, 50.2(2015):18–19. Academic Search Complete.Web. December 12, 2016.
Thompson, Herbert J. "The Black Hills Flood" Weatherwise 8 July 2010:162–173. Print.

External links
The Rapid City Public Library offers an online digital archive which collects audio and video recordings of survivors, written accounts and photos from survivors, as well as news broadcasts from the 1972 flood.

1972 floods in the United States
1972 in South Dakota
Black Hills
Dam failures in the United States
Floods in the United States
Natural disasters in South Dakota